NGC 7331, also known as Caldwell 30, is an unbarred spiral galaxy about  away in the constellation Pegasus.  It was discovered by William Herschel in 1784. NGC 7331 is the brightest galaxy in the field of a visual grouping known as the NGC 7331 Group of galaxies. In fact, the other members of the group, NGC 7335, 7336, 7337 and 7340, lie far in the background at distances of approximately 300-350 million light years.

The galaxy appears similar in size and structure to the Milky Way, and is sometimes referred to as "the Milky Way's twin". However, discoveries in the 2000s regarding the structure of the Milky Way may call this similarity into doubt, particularly because the latter is now believed to be a barred spiral, compared to the unbarred status of NGC 7331. In spiral galaxies the central bulge typically co-rotates with the disk but the bulge in the galaxy NGC 7331 is rotating in the opposite direction to the rest of the disk. In both visible light and infrared photos of the NGC 7331, the core of the galaxy appears to be slightly off-center, with one side of the disk appearing to extend further away from the core than the opposite side.

Multiple supernova events have been observed in this galaxy. SN 1959D, a Type IIL supernova, was the first supernova identified within NGC 7331.  The supernova was discovered by Milton Humason and H. S. Gates in a survey at Palomar Observatory. More recent supernovae are SN 2013bu and SN 2014C, the latter of which underwent an unusual "metamorphosis" from a hydrogen-poor Type Ib to a hydrogen-rich Type IIn over the course of a year .
 A 1903 photographic plate from Yerkes Observatory shows a magnitude 16.6 candidate transient that may have also been a supernova.


See also
 M94 – another galaxy with a prominent starburst ring
 NGC 1512 – another galaxy with a prominent starburst ring
 Flocculent spiral galaxy

References

External links
 
 Calar Alto Observatory – NGC 7331
 APOD (2004-07-01) – "A Galaxy So Inclined"
 SST – "Morphology of Our Galaxy's 'Twin'"
 NGC 7331 at the astro-photography site of Mr. T. Yoshida
 NGC7331 at W. Kloehr Astrophotography
 
 SEDS – NGC 7331

NGC 7331 Group
Unbarred spiral galaxies
Pegasus (constellation)
7331
12113
69327
030b
Astronomical objects discovered in 1784